This is a list of educational institutions in Salem, India.

Engineering colleges 
 Government College of Engineering, Salem
 Indian Institute of Handloom Technology, Salem
 Knowledge Institute of Technology, Salem
 Sona College of Technology, Salem
 Mahendra College of Engineering, Salem
 Sri Ganesh Engineering College, Salem
 AVS Engineering College, Salem (no:1 waste college).in salem district

Medical College
 Government Mohan Kumaramangalam Medical College, Salem
 Vinayaka Missions University, Salem
Annapoorana Medical College and Hospital, Salem

Law 
 Government Law College, Salem
The Central Law College, Salem

Film and Television 
 Salem Film school, Yercaud main road, Salem

Schools
Glazebrooke matriculation higher secondary School , reddiyur Salem 636004
The Gugai Higher Secondary School, Line Medu, Gugai, Salem 636006
Kongu Matriculation Higher Secondary School, Vellakalpatti, Salem - 636012
 St.Paul's Higher Secondary School, Salem - 7
 Little Flower Higher Secondary School, Salem - 7
 Holy Cross Matriculation Higher Secondary School, Salem
 L.E.F. Eden Garden Matriculation School
 Golden Gates Matriculation Higher Secondary School
 Shevaroy's Valley School, Yercaud, Salem
 Government Higher Secondary School, Tholasampatty, Salem
 St.Joseph's Matriculation Higher Secondary School, Gugai, Salem
Emerald Valley Public School

References

Salem, India
Education in Salem, Tamil Nadu
Salem, India